The most-liked video on TikTok, with over 61 million likes, was uploaded by Bella Poarch and features her lip-syncing and bobbing her head to the song "Sophie Aspin Send" (also known as "M to the B") by Millie B.

Top videos 
The following table lists the 25 most-liked videos on TikTok.

The user with the most videos in the top 25 is Khaby Lame with six. The most used song on the list is "SugarCrash!" by ElyOtto, which is used in three of the most-liked videos.

Historical most-liked videos
The following table lists the last four videos that were once the most-liked post on TikTok, with the number of likes as they were when the top spot was reached.

See also
 List of most-followed TikTok accounts

Notes

References

21st century-related lists
Lists of Internet-related superlatives
TikTok
Tiktok
Lists of videos